William Alexander Young (born 22 November 1992) is a professional cricketer who plays as a batsman for the New Zealand cricket team and captains Northamptonshire.

Young was captain of the New Zealand Under-19 cricket team at 2012 ICC Under-19 Cricket World Cup.

He made his international debut for the New Zealand cricket team in December 2020.

Career
In the 2011/12 New Zealand domestic cricket season he made his first-class debut for Central Districts, becoming the team's captain in December 2015 at just 23 years of age. Under his captaincy the Central Stags won the one-day Ford Trophy in 2016 and the first-class Plunket Shield unbeaten in 2018. Young then elected to step down from the captaincy to focus on his batting and making the New Zealand side.

In December 2018, he was named in New Zealand's Test squad for the series for the first time against Sri Lanka, but he did not play.

In March 2019, Young was named to make his Test cricket debut one day before a Test match between New Zealand and Bangladesh was scheduled to begin at Hagley Oval. However, a terrorist attack in Christchurch on the same afternoon saw the match cancelled by New Zealand Cricket.

Despite not yet having played an international match, in May 2019 he was one of the twenty players awarded an annual NZC contract for the 2019–20 season by New Zealand Cricket.

In May 2019, Young was going to be named as a reserve player for New Zealand in the 2019 Cricket World Cup, but made the decision to undergo shoulder surgery instead after an injury to his right labrum at a training camp.

Despite his shoulder injury, Young scored back-to-back centuries for a New Zealand XI against Australia in a one-day warm-up series of three unofficial ODIs in Brisbane in May 2019. Young averaged more than 100 in the series with consecutive scores of 60, 130 and 111 against the defending Cricket World Cup champions.

In November 2020, Young was named in the New Zealand A cricket team for practice matches against the touring West Indies team. Later the same month, he was named in New Zealand's Test squad for the series against the West Indies. He made his Test debut for New Zealand on 3 December 2020, against the West Indies.

In March 2021, Young was named in New Zealand's One Day International (ODI) squad for their series against Bangladesh. He made his ODI debut for New Zealand on 20 March 2021, against Bangladesh. Later the same month, Young was named in New Zealand's Twenty20 International (T20I) squad, also for their series against Bangladesh. He made his T20I debut for New Zealand on 28 March 2021, against Bangladesh.

In March 2022, in the opening match against the Netherlands, Young scored his first century in ODIs, with an unbeaten 103 runs.

In January 2023 Young hit five consecutive deliveries for six in an over of a T20 match off Auckland spinner Louis Delport. He was dismissed in the final ball of the over attempting to hit the rare six sixes in an over feat.

References

External links
 

1992 births
Living people
Central Districts cricketers
Durham cricketers
New Zealand cricketers
New Zealand Test cricketers
New Zealand One Day International cricketers
New Zealand Twenty20 International cricketers
Northamptonshire cricketers
Northamptonshire cricket captains